Steven Diez was the defending champion but lost in the second round to Jason Kubler.

Taro Daniel won the title after defeating Yannick Hanfmann 6–2, 6–2 in the final.

Seeds
All seeds receive a bye into the second round.

Draw

Finals

Top half

Section 1

Section 2

Bottom half

Section 3

Section 4

References

External links
Main draw
Qualifying draw

2020 ATP Challenger Tour